The Rio Grande cutthroat trout (Oncorhynchus clarki virginalis), a member of the family Salmonidae, is found in northern New Mexico and southern Colorado in tributaries of the Rio Grande.

It is one of 14 subspecies of cutthroat trout native to the western United States, and is the state fish of New Mexico. Cutthroat trout were the first New World trout encountered by Europeans when in 1541, Spanish explorer Francisco de Coronado recorded seeing trout in the Pecos River near Santa Fe, New Mexico. These were most likely Rio Grande cutthroat trout .

Life history
Rio Grande cutthroat trout typically spawn between mid-May and mid-June. Males are sexually mature at age two; females mature at age three. They live an average of five years, but in rare cases, may survive into their teens. Rio Grande cutthroat feed opportunistically on aquatic insects and terrestrial insects that fall into the water.

Rio Grande cutthroat trout have irregular shaped spots that are concentrated behind the dorsal fin, smaller less numerous spots located primarily above the lateral line anterior to the dorsal fin, and basibranchial teeth that are minute or absent. Rio Grande cutthroat trout are light rose to red-orange on the sides and pink or yellow-orange on the belly.

Conservation status
Rio Grande cutthroat have the distinction of being the southernmost subspecies of cutthroat trout. However, due to the loss of populations across their native range and reports of Rio Grande cutthroat in Mexico and Texas, it is unclear how far south this trout once occurred. The Mexican reports have been all but dismissed, but Garrett and Matlock (1991) provided evidence indicating that Rio Grande cutthroat were likely native to Texas. Today the southernmost known populations are found on the eastern flanks of the Gila Mountains in Southern New Mexico.

Rio Grande cutthroats currently live on 700 miles of stream in the Santa Fe National Forest, which is approximately 91% of their historical range. The Rio Grande cutthroat trout was a candidate for listing under the Endangered Species Act from 2008 to 2014. 

In 2014 it was removed from candidacy as it was determined that listing was not warranted for this species.

The Rio Grande cutthroat trout evolved in New Mexico as a member of a native fish assemblage that included the longnose dace, the Rio Grande chub and the Rio Grande sucker.

References

External links

Rio Grande cutthroat trout
Cold water fish
Freshwater fish of the United States
Fish of the Western United States
Fauna of the Southwestern United States
Fauna of the Rio Grande valleys
Fauna of the Rocky Mountains
Endemic fauna of Colorado
Endemic fauna of New Mexico
Taxa named by Charles Frédéric Girard
Rio Grande cutthroat trout
Symbols of New Mexico